Little Big Shot is a 1952 British comedy crime film by Jack Raymond and starring Ronald Shiner, Marie Löhr and Derek Farr. It was produced by Henry Halsted's Byron Film and distributed by Associated British. The film's sets were designed by the art director Wilfred Arnold. It was the final film of Raymond who had begun his career in the silent era.

Plot summary
This crime comedy depicts the bumbling son of a recently deceased crime boss, who does his best to follow in his father's footsteps, but to little avail. In the end, he accidentally switches sides and helps to bring in the crooks.

Cast
 Ronald Shiner as Henry Hawkwood
 Marie Löhr as Mrs. Maddox 
Derek Farr as Det. Sgt. Wilson 
Yvette Wyatt as Ann 
Digby Wolfe as Peter Carton  
Marjorie Stewart as Miss Crane 
Manning Whiley as Mike Connor 
Danny Green as Big Mo 
Victor Baring as Little Mo 
 Cyril Conway as Tony Vapini

Critical reception
Sky Movies noted, "another reminder of how much the world of British comedy has missed the abrasive cockney wit of Ronald Shiner. Here he plays the soft-hearted son of a famous crook who tries to emulate his father. Alas, he's too nice to be a criminal, and the gang only keep him out of respect for his old man. Digby Wolfe, once a familiar television face on panel games and reviews, and later creator of Laugh-In, scores as an impecunious journalist ever on the look-out for a scoop."

References

External links
 
 
 

1952 films
British crime comedy films
Films directed by Jack Raymond
1950s crime comedy films
1952 comedy films
Films with screenplays by John Paddy Carstairs
British films based on plays
1950s English-language films
1950s British films